KNIN may refer to:

 KNIN-FM, a radio station (92.9 FM) licensed to Wichita Falls, Texas, United States
 KNIN-TV, a television station (channel 9 virtual/10 digital) licensed to Caldwell, Idaho, United States
 Knin, a town in Croatia